The Cherokee Cases were a trio of cases before the Marshall Court:
Tassels' Case: a December 1830 writ of error in the criminal case of George Tassels, mooted by Tassels' execution before the Court could hear the case 
Cherokee Nation v. Georgia, 30 U.S. (5 Pet.) 1 (1831)
Worcester v. Georgia, 31 U.S. (6 Pet.) 515 (1832)

See also
Aboriginal title in the Marshall Court
Cherokee tobacco case